The pretty worm-lizard (Aprasia pulchella) is a species of lizard in the Pygopodidae family endemic to Australia.

References

Pygopodids of Australia
Aprasia
Reptiles described in 1839
Taxa named by John Edward Gray